In geometry, a spherical shell is a generalization of an annulus to three dimensions. It is the region of a ball between two concentric spheres of differing radii.

Volume
The volume of a spherical shell is the difference between the enclosed volume of the outer sphere and the enclosed volume of the inner sphere:
 
 
 

Approximation
An approximation for the volume of a thin spherical shell is the surface area of the inner sphere multiplied by the thickness  of the shell:
 

See also 
 Spherical pressure vessel
 Ball
 Solid torus
 Bubble
 Sphere

References 

Elementary geometry
Geometric shapes
Spherical geometry